Show Me the Ghost is a 2021 South Korean comedy horror film, written and directed by Kim Eun-kyoung and starring Han Seung-yeon, Kim Hyun-mok and Hong Seung-bum. The film depicts the story of two job seeking best friends Ho-du and Yeji, whose dreams and hopes have been ruined. It was premiered at 25th Bucheon International Fantastic Film Festival on July 10 and was theatrically released on September 9, 2021.

Synopsis
This self-exorcism comedy of two best friends of 20 years, Yeji (Han Seung-yeon) and Hodu (Kim Hyun-mok) has creepy horror. Both the friends are seeking jobs and need a house to rent. Then they get a fully furnished house with a low deposit and low monthly rent. To their dismay they find a ghost living in the house. They have no money and no place to go, so they try self-exorcism with the help of a self proclaimed exorcist.

Cast 
 Han Seung-yeon as Yeji, a ten-year-old trainee
 Kim Hyun-mok as Ho-du, a convenience store part-timer
 Hong Seung-bum as Kidu, an exorcist

Release
The film was invited at 25th Bucheon International Fantastic Film Festival in Korean Fantastic features section. It had its premiere in the festival on July 10, 2021. It was theatrically released on September 9, 2021.

Home media
The film is available for streaming on video on demand service at IPTV and digital cable TV from September 23, 2021.

Reception

Kim So-mi writing for Cine21 said, that the film has "charm of a complex genre interwoven with horror elements and comedy." Kim felt that the director Kim Eun-kyung's film "flows in an erratic and pleasant twist from beginning to end." Kim liking the characterization in the film wrote, "A special attraction is the harmony of characters that create psychological intimacy. Kim concluded, "Both horror and comedy have a bland feel, but the development that gradually sharpens the senses of justice, solidarity, and friendship gives off a pleasant warmth."

Awards

References

External links
 
 
 
 

2020s Korean-language films
2021 films
South Korean comedy horror films
2021 comedy horror films